Marzelan-e Mohammad Morad (also Romanized as Marzelān-e Moḩammad Morād; also known as Marzelān) is a village in Dasht-e Hor Rural District, in the Central District of Salas-e Babajani County, Kermanshah Province, Iran. At the 2006 census, its population was 135, in 27 families.

References 

Populated places in Salas-e Babajani County